Thimbleby's Tower, formerly known as Wolf's Tower, is a structure in the city walls of Chester, Cheshire, England.  It stands on the eastern section of the walls, between Eastgate and Newgate.  The tower is recorded in the National Heritage List for England as a designated Grade I listed building.

History
The tower probably dates originally from the 13th century.  It was partly demolished in the siege of Chester in 1644–46 during the Civil War.  Between 1702 and 1708 the whole of the city walls was converted into a raised walkway and it is likely that the tower was modified as part of this process.  Repairs were carried out to it in 1879.  It was further altered in 1994–95 for Chester City Council by Peter de Figuerdo.

Architecture
Thimbleby's Tower is constructed in coursed red sandstone rubble.  Its plan is semi-octagonal, and it appears to be the outer part of a drum tower without its upper storeys.  The lower chamber contains three loops (unglazed slit windows), and at the level of the walkway are the springers of a former vault.  During the 1994–95 alterations, the stone parapet between the walkway and the tower was replaced by an oak-framed polycarbonate screen.  A steeply-pitched gabled roof, hung with tiles, was added to the top of the structure.  The citation in the National Heritage List for England states that this "masks its former defensive features and purpose".

See also

Grade I listed buildings in Cheshire West and Chester

References

Buildings and structures in Chester
Grade I listed buildings in Chester
Grade I listed towers
Towers in Cheshire